Tilney was a financial planning and investment firm in the UK. It acquired financial advisors, Smith & Williamson, in 2019 and the enlarged firm was rebranded as Evelyn Partners in 2022.

History

The firm was established as a firm of stockbrokers by Thomas Tilney in 1836.

Permira agreed to buy Tilney from Deutsche Bank, in February 2014, with the ambition of creating a wealth manager with £9 billion of assets. After completion of the deal in May 2014 Bestinvest and Tilney combined to create Tilney Bestinvest.

Tilney acquired Smith & Williamson with backing from Warburg Pincus in 2019. and the combined company was renamed Tilney Smith & Williamson in 2020.

In February 2022 the merged company Tilney Smith & Williamson, owned by private equity funds Permira and Warburg Pincus, was re-branded as Evelyn Partners.

References

External links
 Company Web Site

Financial services companies established in 1836
Investment management companies of the United Kingdom
Private equity portfolio companies
Companies based in London
1836 establishments in England